Josef Posejpal is a former male international table tennis player from Czechoslovakia.

Table tennis career
He won a silver medal at the 1954 World Table Tennis Championships in the Swaythling Cup (men's team event) with Ivan Andreadis, Adolf Šlár, Ladislav Štípek and Václav Tereba.

Personal life
He was a store-keeper with the Baraba Tunnel Construction national enterprise.

See also
 List of table tennis players
 List of World Table Tennis Championships medalists

References

Czechoslovak table tennis players
1934 births
Living people
World Table Tennis Championships medalists